By-elections to the 10th Canadian Parliament were held to elect members of the House of Commons of Canada between the 1904 federal election and the 1908 federal election. The Liberal Party of Canada led a majority government for the 10th Canadian Parliament.

The list includes Ministerial by-elections which occurred due to the requirement that Members of Parliament recontest their seats upon being appointed to Cabinet. These by-elections were almost always uncontested. This requirement was abolished in 1931.

Alberta and Saskatchewan entered Confederation in 1905. Unlike in the case of other provinces that joined after 1867, the new provinces were already represented by ridings originally drawn for the Northwest Territories, and the members elected in 1904 continued to sit as representatives of the old NWT ridings (some of which straddled the new border), except where they resigned as indicated below.

See also
List of federal by-elections in Canada

Sources
 Parliament of Canada–Elected in By-Elections 

1908 elections in Canada
1907 elections in Canada
1906 elections in Canada
1905 elections in Canada
10th